Umberto Klinger (August 3, 1900 in Saluzzo – January 26, 1971 in Venice) was an aviator, Italian politician and entrepreneur.

Biography 

Volunteer in the Alpini assault troop Arditi detachments during the First World War, subsequently participated in the Fiume Exploit event. Appointed by Italo Balbo, the Italian Air Minister from 1929 to 1933, he chaired and organized the first Italian airline flag company.

Senior pilot officer of the reserve in World War II, for his exploits (he personally led his crews in various military operations) has been decorated with five silver medals. He was Chief of Staff of the Special Air Service, a large transport unit of the Italian Royal Air Force.

After the conflict has reconstructed and directed the Officine Aeronautiche di Venezia (Venice Aeronautical Workshops). In the same period he organized the services of four air companies of which two foreigners.

1st Post-war period

He was a personal friend of Quadrumviro Italo Balbo and part, in the city of Ferrara, of a small group of Balbo's strict associates, including the journalist Nello Quilici and the Jewish lawyer Renzo Ravenna. He participated in "The economic reconstruction of the province of Ferrara" project, signed together with the same Balbo and Vittorio Cini and served as Federal Secretary of the city.

Oversaw the organization of Ala Littoria S.A., the first Italian flag airline with public capital, the result of the merger of six private companies.

Elected deputy in 1934 for the XXIX Legislature Klinger intervened on civil aviation issues, in particular on the delays in the organization of a trans-Atlantic link recommended by Balbo before taking up the post of Governor of Libya.

In the position of president and chief executive he oversaw the expansion of his air company Mediterranean and Northern European networks and the implementation of regular trade links between the mother country and the colonies in the Horn of Africa and the African continent in general.

In 1938, along with the commander Carlo Tonini, he made a Cant Z.506 double crossing of the Atlantic Ocean in view of the launch of regular lines with Latin America. As part of the project sent experts to Salt Island, in the archipelago of Cape Verde, to study the possibility of installing an intermediate stop, and Buenos Aires to check the convenience of using the flights of Corporaciòn Sul Americana de Servicios Aereos as a link between the hinterland of Argentine and neighboring countries with the Italian Atlantic line.

World War II

Klinger participated in the Second World War with the rank of Lieutenant Colonel pilot of the reserve, receiving five silver medals, one of which given "on the field". He realized the first war air link with the Viceroy of Ethiopia, Duke Amedeo of Aosta, in Addis Ababa. With nocturnal flights over deserts and enemy territories, he established air routes for the supply of Italian East Africa, precluded by the closure of the Suez Canal by the Britons. Then followed the command of 114º Independent Group of Terrestrial Bombers, and the appointment as Chief of Staff of the Special Air Service who had the task of supplying the Italian troops in Tunisia, and the organization of paratroopers special operations. An experienced pilot, Umberto had logged over 4,600 flying hours at the controls of different types of aircraft, of which 940 hours in wartime.

2nd Post-war period

After the end of WWII, Klinger accepted the invitation by the Municipal Administration of Venice and of the new Italian Government to buy out and rebuild the Aeronautical Workshops of Venice Lido, yet belonged to Ala Littoria, destroyed by the retreating Germans. Engaging its scarce resources, along with his brother's Luigi, he founded the Officine Aeronavali di Venezia. Its customers became main Italian and foreign companies, public and private ones, attracted by the ability of the Workshops in restructuring and overhauling of large aircraft. At the same time Umberto organized the activities of four air companies: the Egyptian S.A.I.D.E., the Lebanese LIA, the Italians Aeralpi for interregional transport and Società Aerea Mediterranea for charter transports and for the development of popular aerial tourism.

Major American companies settled relations with the venetian enterprise. The great aviator Chalmers Goodlin, interested in the trade of aircraft, settled for many years at the Lido with Klinger establishing an effective collaboration.

In the late 1960s, unfortunately, the persistent shortfall in payments by especially public institutions determined a financial crisis for the company resulting in the inability to meet its obligations to its employees. Exhausted attempts to obtain timely settlement of claims, Klinger committed suicide on January 26, 1971. The day before he had gone to Rome to obtain payment of his outstanding claims as unable to pay the salaries of about 500 Aeronavali workers whom in the meantime had gone on strike. The gesture raised a stir and together with many recriminations came in, in a matter of weeks, the requested resources.

The city of Venice, called on by a popular petition, has honored his memory by dedicating the stretch of the Lido promenade that borders the Venice-Lido Airport.

Honors and awards

five Medaglie d'argento al Valor Militare
Medaglia di bronzo al Valor Militare
Croce di guerra al Valor Militare
Medaglia commemorativa della guerra italo-austriaca 1915–1918
Medaglia interalleata della vittoria
Medaglia commemorativa dell'Unità d'Italia
Medaglia commemorativa delle operazioni militari in Africa Orientale
Medaglia commemorativa della spedizione in Albania
Medaglia commemorativa della marcia di Ronchi
Grande Ufficiale dell’Ordine della Corona d’Italia
Cavaliere dell'Ordine dei Santi Maurizio e Lazzaro
Ufficiale della Legion d'onore
Ufficiale dell'Ordine di Skanderbeg
Cavaliere dell'Ordine coloniale della Stella d'Italia

Notes

Works
 L'altra sponda (Note d'una crociera adriatica), Introduzione di Nello Quilici, Ferrara, 1928
 "Rinascita Polesana", Mondadori 1924 Verona Introduzione di Curzio Suckert
 "Terre d'Italia", Officine Grafiche Corriere del Polesine 1925 Rovigo
 "Le comunicazioni aeree in Africa e l'Italia", Fondazione, A.Volta Roma 1938

Bibliography 
 Delisi. B. “Klinger Fondatore dell'Ala Littoria”. Folgore, organo ufficiale dei Paracadutisti d'Italia. Roma Genn. 1992.
 Delisi. B. “Un manager in guerra 1940–1943. “Lido di Oggi Lido di Allora n.10. Venezia agosto 1994
 Delisi B.”Balbo, Klinger e la prima compagnia aerea di bandiera italiana” Atti del Convegno Internazionale nel centenario della nascita di Italo Balbo, Roma, 7–8 novembre 1996,
 Delisi B. Klinger M.S. a cura di, Atti della commemorazione, Lido di Venezia 22 settembre 1991. Edizioni Serigraf Roma 1996.
 De Marchi I. "Ricordo di Umberto Klinger” Rivista Aeronautica Roma n.1 1992
 Delisi. B. "La linea Italiana dell'Atlantico Sud. Il contributo dell'Ala Littoria” catalogo della Mostra Le Ali della Rondine Compleso Munumentale di San Michele a Ripa 7 -26 maggio 1992 Itaca Roma.
 Civoli M. "S.A.S. I Servizi Aerei Speciali della Regia Aeronautica 1940–1943", Gribaudo, 2000.
 Delisi B. Klinger M.S. “Un Eroe Veneziano, Umberto Klinger e i suoi aeroplani" Giorgio Apostolo Ed. Milano 2010.
 Arpino M. “Vita Straordinaria di Umberto Klinger, aviatore romantico al servizio dell'Italia” Risk Quaderni di Geostrategia Roma, Novembre- Dicembre 2010.

Italian politicians
Italian aviators
1900 births
1971 deaths
1971 suicides
Regia Aeronautica personnel of World War II
Italian military personnel of World War I
Suicides in Italy